Noel Mkandawire (25 December 1978 - 2017) is a Malawian football (soccer) player with Super ESCOM of the Malawi Premier Division.

International career
He has also frequently been capped for the Malawi national football team.

References

1978 births
2017 deaths
Malawian footballers
Malawi international footballers
Association football forwards
ESCOM United FC players